Isabella Cortese (fl. 1561), was an Italian alchemist and writer of the Renaissance.  All that is known of her life and work is from her book on alchemy, The Secrets of Lady Isabella Cortese. Cortese was also well-versed in several fields other than alchemy. She helped develop a variety of facial cosmetic products and made a variety of other contributions to science during the 16th century.

16th-century Italian science culture
 
Throughout the 16th century, scientific culture flourished in many different areas of study, not only in academies and courts but also in a number of books. There was a new excitement for manipulating nature and acquiring secrets for a wide range of uses, including cosmetics, alchemical transformations and medical remedies. In early modern contexts, the word “secret” and “experiment” were synonymous. However, it didn't mean that it was unknown, rather, that the “secret” or the “experiment” had been proven to work. In the 16th century, a secret was a form of currency. It could be used to pay debts or be exchanged, but also could increase ones intellectual, political, and social standing. While the demand for secrets increased it began catching more resonance with many women but also, with men. Woman literacy rates in the 16th century, although still much lower than their male counterparts, were increasing steadily due to vernacularization and the rise of available prints in Europe. Very few things were able to cross the gender and class boundaries but books of secrets did. This new form of science was appealing to all but wasn't only for the rich and wealthy. It transcended boundaries that many most things could not. The books of secrets were circulating through Italy, which was in manuscript form. This manuscript was a collection of many different secrets, ranging from medicinal to cosmetic uses. Moreover, women we sought to pay special attention to subjects like domestic management and women's health. These categories highlighted many topics regarding pregnancy and fertility to prepare for others like childbirth. Another scope of study focused on practical everyday life tasks that included ways of maintaining health and hygiene through outlets of alchemy and cosmetics. Needless to say, the book of secrets provided remedies for all types of needs for humans to thrive. The engagement of medicine and types of therapies ranged from less serious types of pain such as rashes to other crucial topics like infertility. Instructions on how to create face creams, preserve wine, or remove stains were general lifestyle skills to help women through providing a source of entertainment while not fully discussing the scientific mechanism breakdowns. Additionally, it included content relating to home-management with alchemical knowledge that grasped the attention of more men. In manuscript form, it made it through Italy and it introduced the public to scientific culture it a way that priorly wasn't accessible. Off the allure of the obscurity, mystery, and novelty of the "books of secrets" genre, Isabella Cortese's I secreti della signora Isabella Cortese flourished in popularity. Cortese's book swept the scientific world. By 1599, Cortese's book had seven editions and placed her name among the Professori di Segreti-"Professor of Secrets"- listed by Tomaso Garzoni in his encyclopedic Piazza Universale. Although such texts are over a hundred years old, it still played a significant role in inspiring others such as author Carol Firenze, who wrote a novel about how olive oil can benefits one's hair, complexion, etc.

Women in science in the 16th century

During the 16th century, women were still continuing to get a foothold in the realm of science. While males still dominated most areas of expertise in the realms of medicine and other practices, the female body continued to be most knowledgeable by the women themselves. Having the knowledge of their own bodies, this led to a specific niche of female knowledge that could be published in “books of secrets” written by females. However, stigmas still remained about female capabilities of understanding real science and experiments. Works of female cosmetic and medicinal remedies were strategically written under the name of a woman, so the work itself would be underscored of its value and authenticity by the male population, while still being reputable in the eyes of women during that time. The “secrets” were recipes of different cosmetic and medicinal purposes. The format of Isabella Cortese's I secreti della signora Isabella Cortese was also easy to follow, with recipes showing step-by-step instructions to insure simplicity and conciseness that allowed women to read along. It is also to be made known that these step-by-step manuals were also being translated into many different languages so that women from all around the globe were able to read the "book of secrets". Published during the era of modernization of Italy, Cortese's work was popular and she was considered an itinerant female alchemist the supported women and their ability to read. The knowledge she had gathered through travel to several countries like Moravia, Poland, and Hungary enabled her to create her various forms of work which advanced the women within science of the 16th century. She provided references to her alchemical recipes through the use of pictures including laboratory equipment and other props for intended literacy simplicity for women to follow along. However, the overall development and participation of women within alchemical engagement in countries such as Germany, Spain, France, Italy, and England continues to remain a mystery.

Education 
Cortese claimed to have studied alchemy for thirty years, including the works of established alchemists such as Geber, Ramon Llull, and Arnold of Villanova. She, however, was widely dismissive of their work calling it "complete gibberish, filled with fables and crazy recipes that only make you lose time and money".  She believed she had gained nothing by studying their work but an "increase in the likelihood of an early death".  It is said that Isabella Cortese learned more about the field of alchemy through traveling around the globe, rather than simply reading some older books that discuss the topic of alchemy.

The Secrets of Lady Isabella Cortese
In 1561, her book I secreti della signora Isabella Cortese or The Secrets of Lady Isabella Cortese first appeared in print in Venice, introducing alchemy to a wider readership. These books belonged to the genre "books of secrets." This genre gained notoriety around the 17th century. The "secrets" of Isabella Cortese would more closely be referred to as experiments in society today. Many of these "secrets" were considered to be proven medical remedies and everyday cure-alls. Experiments that were considered highly effective or had a high success rate, however, could be used as an exchange of goods or as a way to pay off debt and in some instances could even help one jump into a higher social standing or class. Many of these remedies, over time and by different cultures, would change and become highly sought after and prized within their given community. Apart from medical and cosmetic remedies, other uses show advice for how to run a household, and also discussion of how to turn metal into gold.  These included instruction on how to make many practical items such as toothpaste, glue, polish, soap, and cosmetics. One treatment calls for a combination of fixed camphor, quicksilver, and sulfur to make a "universal medicine" through a metaphorical joining of mind, body, and soul. Another calls for a mixture of quail testicles, large winged ants, oriental amber, musk, and an oil made from elder and storax.  This mixture was a supposed treatment for erectile dysfunction.  As long as all instructions are followed exactly, the book claims all of its secrets will be known to the reader. The book showed much about unknown parts of nature and how they can be used medicinally. The recipes provided in the content of the work were divided into four distinct books focusing on many different viewpoints that applied to either males or females. The first book illustrates the idea of medicinal recipes and elaborates on ways to treat the main diseases spreading through Europe at the time. These include remedies for diseases like syphilis or ways to cure the common plague. Additionally, this portion heavily promotes the general way of healing wounds through means of alchemy with processes including distillation or other potential ways relating back to alchemy. The second book focuses more on how to produce substances like gold or elixir as mentioned before. Moreover, there are common rules that Cortese suggests for readers in this section before moving forward like working alone, making use of vessels, immersing oneself with familiarity of alchemical experiments, keeping eyes on fire, preparation in the use of tongs, secrecy in all work, find trustworthy allies, and praising God after success of an experiment by serving the less fortunate. Once these rules were established, directions on ways to alter properties of metals were introduced, such as changing copper to gold. The third book has broader coverage, including topics that drew much attention such as assembling mirrors, dying hair, and removing stains. The final book is directed towards women through beauty. It investigates the practice of enhancing beauty though creams, powders, hair dye, and oils.

Cosmetic recipes attributed to Isabella Cortese
Isabella Cortese mentions several recipes in her book that are quite intriguing. Although Cortese worked in alchemy, she also focused on cosmetic transformations to the female body very similar to what we know today as cosmetology. These transformations require recipes made up of ingredients that many might question today.

For instance, there is one recipe for face color that is made as follows: Obtain a few birds with white feathers. During the duration of the next week to two weeks feed them only nuts from the pine. Then, after the one to two weeks are over, take the birds and butcher them. After butchering the birds mix the liquid obtained and some portions of the bird with a small amount of sweetbread and also a small portion of white bread as well. Next, add some goats milk and heat the solution. Once finished heating, distill the final product that will be applied to the face. This final product should help improve one's pale complexion while also revealing one's true skin tone.

Furthermore, there is a different recipe engraved in her "book of secrets" that is called to help cleanse and detoxify one's face. The recipe is as follows: First, gather some lemons beans; be sure the beans are dried. Then, once you have mixed the two add the mixture into a container full of white wine. When done, gather up some honey, a few eggs, and a couple ounces of goat milk. Combine all of these ingredients together and then begin to distill the mixture. This final mixture can be applied to help rid the face of toxins and harmful chemicals that usually either dry up one's face or make it extra oily. These are just two of the most interesting recipes that are attributed to Cortese. Whether or not these recipes worked was determined by the beauty standards of 16th-century Europe. By contrast, today's world of cosmetology deals with many different shades of melanin, different types of skin, different hair textures, and different opinions of beauty for people from all over the world.

Reception
In its time, The Secrets of Lady Isabella Cortese was quite popular.  It was published in eleven editions between 1561 and 1677, as well as two editions of a German translation. Part of this success can be attributed to Cortese's insistence on her readers keeping her book's secrets to themselves. She asked her readers to keep people away from their alchemical workplace and to burn her book once they had learned all of its secrets.

See also
 Timeline of women in science

References

Italian alchemists
Italian women chemists
16th-century alchemists
16th-century Italian women writers
16th-century Italian scientists
16th-century women scientists
Women writers (Renaissance)